The Cuba meteorite exploded over Pinar del Río, Cuba on February 1, 2019, between 1:16 – 1:17 p.m. EST, causing a sonic boom powerful enough to shatter windows. Several stony meteorites were found on the ground.

References

 Dramatic Meteorite Fall, Sonic Booms In Cuba

Meteorites